Preußen Danzig was a German association football club from the city of Danzig, West Prussia (today Gdańsk, Poland).


History
The club was established in 1909 as Turn- und Fechtverein Preußen Danzig, a gymnastics and fencing club. The footballers formed an independent side in 1923 playing as Sportclub Preußen 1909 Danzig.

TuF Danzig was a local side through the 20s and on into the early 30s and made two appearances in the playoff round of the regional Baltenverband. After the re-organization of German football under the Third Reich in 1933, the team, now known as Sport-Club Preußen Danzig, became part of the Gauliga Ostpreußen, one of sixteen regional top flight divisions. That division was subject to frequent reshaping through the course of World War II and SC also played in the Gauliga Danzig (1935–38), the Gauliga Ostpreußen (1939–40), and the Gauliga Danzig-Westpreußen (1940–45).

The club enjoyed limited success within its division, winning the Gauliga Danzig–Westpreußen title in 1941. SC took part in the national level playoffs through that title and a group title within their split division in 1934, but were unable to advance out of the preliminary rounds. They also took part in play for the Tschammerpokal, predecessor of today's DFB-Pokal (German Cup), but never got out of the first round.

Preußen Danzig disappeared in the aftermath of the war when the city of Danzig became part of Poland.

Honours
 Gauliga Ostpreußen champions: 1934
 Gauliga Danzig-Westpreußen champions: 1941

References

 Grüne, Hardy (1996). Vom Kronprinzen bis zur Bundesliga. Kassel: AGON Sportverlag 
 Das deutsche Fußball-Archiv historical German domestic league tables

External links
 Der Fußball in Ostpreußen und Danzig (en: Football in East Prussia and Danzig)

Football clubs in Germany
Association football clubs established in 1909
Association football clubs disestablished in 1945
Defunct football clubs in former German territories
Sport in Gdańsk
History of Gdańsk
1909 establishments in Germany
1909 establishments in Poland